Football at the 2021 Islamic Solidarity Games was a football competition that held between 8-16 August 2022 at Konya Metropolitan Municipality Stadium and Karatay Mehmet Otkut Football Field in Konya, Turkey. All players participating in the preliminary and final competitions of the tournament must be born on or after 1 January 1998 (U23). However, up to three male athletes who do not meet this age limit might also be included in the official list of athletes for the final competition. A maximum of 8 teams competed. Teams was divided into 2 groups and there were 4 teams in each group. 

Turkey won the first gold medal in the tournament, by beating Saudi Arabia 1–0 in the final.

Participating teams
Eight participated teams. All teams are of Under-23.

Men

Venues

Squads

Group stage

Group A

Group B

Knockout stage

Semifinals

Bronze medal match

Gold medal match

Final ranking

Goalscorers

References

External links 
Official website 

2017
2021 Islamic Solidarity Games
2022 in association football
International association football competitions hosted by Turkey
2022 in Asian football
2022 in African football
2022 in European football